Birsinghpur railway station is a railway station on Bilaspur–Katni line under Bilaspur railway division of South East Central Railway Zone of Indian Railways. The railway station is situated beside National Highway 43 at Pali Birsinghpur in Umaria district in the Indian state of Madhya Pradesh.

History
The railway line from Katni to Umaria was constructed in 1886 as the Katni–Umaria Provincial State Railway. In 1891, the line was extended to the Bilaspur Junction by Bengal Nagpur Railway.

References

Railway stations in Umaria district
Bilaspur railway division